Junabad may refer to:
 Junabad, Hamadan